Bago River (Pegu River) is a river of southern Myanmar. It flows through Bago and Yangon, joining the Yangon River south of downtown Yangon.

The source of the Bago river comes from many streams in the hills of the Pegu Range with the traditional choice for the source being Sinhnamaung Mountain in Letpadan Township. Modern hydrological surveys find streams further north in Phyu Township that feed into the Bago River Basin. The Bago River flows into Yangon Region meeting the Yangon River at Monkey Point, Botahtaung Township, below which the river is called the Yangon River.

In 1608, the Portuguese mercenary Filipe de Brito e Nicote, known as Nga Zinka to the Burmese, plundered the Shwedagon Pagoda. His men took the 300-ton Great Bell of Dhammazedi using elephants and forced labour. De Brito's intention was to melt the bell down to make cannons. but it fell into this river when he was carrying it across.

Many people have tried to find the bell in the murky waters of the river, so far without success. Professional deep sea diver James Blunt has made 115 exploratory dives, using sonar images of objects in the area for guidance. To this date, it has not been recovered. Several Myanmar divers have died looking for it, including two navy divers who were trapped in a nearby wreck. The bell has since become an object of national superstition believing the search to be cursed and the bell's retrieval to be the key to the nation's rise out of poverty

References

Rivers of Myanmar